Orillia City Council is the governing body of the city of Orillia, Ontario.

Council is made up of 1 Mayor and 9 Councillors (2 per Ward):

 Mayor Steve Clarke
 Ward 1 - Whitney Smith and David Campbell
 Ward 2 - Luke Leatherdale and Ralph Cipolla
 Ward 3 - Jeff Czetwerzuk and Jay Fallis
 Ward 4 - Janet-Lynne Dunford and Tim Lauer

Mayors and Reeves

 Steve Clarke 2014-Present
 Angelo Orsi 2010-2014
 Ron Stevens 2003-2010
 Ted Emond 1986-1988
 Ken McCann
 Clayton Albert 'Clayt' French
 John Palmer
 Isabell Post
 Wilber Cramp
 James Brockett Tudhope - Reeve and Mayor

Town and City Halls

 Tudhope Building 1997– present
 35 West St N ? - 1997
 Orillia City Hall 1895-1997 - multi use building; rebuilt after 1915 fire (completed 1917 and now Orillia Opera House)
 Orillia Town Hall and Jail 1874-1890s - 1st permanent home and demolished to make way for 2nd city hall
 Temperance Hall 1867-1874 - temporary home

References

External links
 

Municipal councils in Ontario
Orillia